Enrico Prinoth was an Italian luger who competed during the 1960s. He won the gold medal in the men's doubles event at the 1961 FIL World Luge Championships in Girenbad, Switzerland.

References
FIL-Luge.org list of World luge champions.  - Accessed January 31, 2008

Italian male lugers
Possibly living people
Year of birth missing
Italian lugers
Sportspeople from Südtirol